Shelley Bennett (born October 14, 1981) is an American actress, producer, and published artist.  Her early roles include Vivian Goodmanson on As the World Turns, and the role of Erica starring opposite Kaley Cuoco, Nick Carter, and Kevin Zegers in the feature film The Hollow from producer Mason Novick (Juno, 500 Days of Summer).  She was also the voice for various characters for Disney's TV series Teamo Supremo.   Recent feature film roles include Sheila in Happy New Year produced by Iain Smith (Children of Men, Cold Mountain) and Amber in Machine Head both due for release in 2011.  She appears in Bill Maher's documentary Bright Day! and is the director and producer for the 2010 documentary Behind the Veil.  In 2009, she served as a film juror for the 19th Cairo International Film Festival for Children and her artwork has been published multiple times in the David Geffen Journal of Arts and Literature .

References 

 
 The New York Times Movies
 http://www.tvguide.com/celebrities/shelley-bennett/tv-listings/192475
 http://www.tvguide.com/soaps/World-Turns-Shelley-55902.aspx

External links 
Website on Shelley Bennett

American soap opera actresses
20th-century American actresses
21st-century American actresses
1981 births
Living people
American film actresses
American voice actresses